Aedh Ua Con Ceanainn (died 1067) was King of Uí Díarmata.

Biography

Aedh was a supporter of Áed in Gai Bernaig, king of Connacht. He fought and died with him at the battle of Turlach Adhnaigh in Aidhne, in 1067. 

The battle of Turlach Adhnaigh, between Áed in Gai Bernaig, King of Connaught, and Aedh, the son of Art Uallach Ua Ruairc (Áed Ua Ruairc), and the men of Breifne along with him; where fell Áed in Gai Bernaig, King of the province of Connaught, the helmsman of the valour of Leath-Chuinn; and the chiefs of Connaught fell along with him, and, among the rest, Aedh Ua Con Ceanainn, lord of Uí Díarmata, and many others. It was to commemorate the death of Aedh Ua Conchobhair this quatrain was composed:"Seven years, seventy, not a short period/And a thousand, great the victory/From the birth of Christ/not false the jurisdiction/Till the fall of Aedh, King of Connaught."

References

 Vol. 2 (AD 903–1171): edition and translation
 Annals of Ulster at CELT: Corpus of Electronic Texts at University College Cork
 Annals of Tigernach at CELT: Corpus of Electronic Texts at University College Cork
Revised edition of McCarthy's synchronisms at Trinity College Dublin.

People from County Galway
1067 deaths
11th-century Irish monarchs
Year of birth unknown